Caroline Frances Cooke (December 29, 1875 – July 8, 1962) was an American silent film actress and screenwriter.

Biography

Career
Cooke was signed in 1913 and starred in about 15 films between 1913 and 1916. She had two brief roles twenty years after that, in 1926 and 1939. In 1939 she appeared in the classic Son of Frankenstein playing the role of Mrs. Neumüller.

She starred with Charlotte Burton in films such as Rose of San Juan which was her first motion picture. In 1914, she wrote the script for The Story of the Olive.

Filmography

External links

 

1875 births
1962 deaths
American silent film actresses
Actresses from Illinois
20th-century American actresses
Place of birth missing
20th-century American screenwriters